Osbornes Mills may refer to:

Osbornes Mills, New Jersey
Osbornes Mills, West Virginia